Meir is the second studio album by Norwegian heavy metal band Kvelertak. It was released on 25 March 2013 (26 March in the US) via Sony Music Scandinavia in Scandinavia, Roadrunner Records in the rest of the world, and by Indie Recordings on vinyl. The album was produced by Kurt Ballou.

Background
Meir (Norwegian for "more") was recorded at GodCity Studios in Salem, Massachusetts, United States and produced by Kurt Ballou of Converge. The cover artwork was created by John Dyer Baizley of the band Baroness. The band released music videos for "Bruane Brenn", "Månelyst" and the self-titled track "Kvelertak".

In 2017, Rolling Stone ranked Meir as 96th on their list of 'The 100 Greatest Metal Albums of All Time.'

Track listing

Personnel
Kvelertak
 Erlend Hjelvik – vocals
 Vidar Landa – guitar
 Bjarte Lund Rolland – guitar, piano, vocals
 Maciek Ofstad – guitar, vocals
 Marvin Nygaard – bass
 Kjetil Gjermundrød – drums, percussion

Guest musicians
Ashley Rose Redshaw – backing vocals ("Spring Fra Livet" and "Nekrokosmos")

Production and recording
 Kurt Ballou – mixing, production

Weekly charts

References

  

2013 albums
Albums produced by Kurt Ballou
Albums with cover art by John Dyer Baizley
Kvelertak albums
Norwegian-language albums
Roadrunner Records albums